The legal and social strictures that define White Americans, and distinguish them from persons who are not considered white by the government and society, have varied throughout the history of the United States.

Background
According to Marxist scholar David Roediger, by the 18th century, "white" had become well established as a racial term at a time when the enslavement of African Americans was widespread. Roediger has argued that the construction of the "white race" in the United States was an effort to mentally distance slave owners from slaves. The process of officially being defined as white by law often came about in court disputes over pursuit of citizenship. The Naturalization Act of 1790 offered naturalization only to "any alien, being a free white person". In at least 52 cases, people denied the status of white by immigration officials sued in court for status as white people.

By 1923, courts had vindicated a "common knowledge" standard, concluding that "scientific evidence" was incoherent. Legal scholar John Tehranian argues that in reality this was a "performance-based" standard, relating to religious practices, culture, education, intermarriage, and a community's role in the United States.
The 2000 U.S. census states that racial categories "generally reflect a social definition of race recognized in this country. They do not conform to any biological, anthropological or genetic criteria". It defines "white people" as "people having origins in any of the original peoples of Europe, the Middle East, or North Africa". The Federal Bureau of Investigation uses the same definition.

The 1990 U.S. census Public Use Microdata Sample (PUMS) listed "Caucasian" or "Aryan" ancestry responses as subgroups of "white" but the 2005 PUMS codes do not. In U.S. census documents, the designation white or Caucasian may overlap with the term Hispanic, which was introduced in the 1980 census as a category of ethnicity, separate and independent of race. In cases where individuals do not self-identify, the U.S. census parameters for race give each national origin a racial value.

Racial prerequisite cases
During the period when only "white" people could become naturalized U.S. citizens, many court decisions were required to define which ethnic groups were included in this term. These are known as the "racial prerequisite cases", and they also informed subsequent legislation.

Specific groups

African Americans

Laws dating from 17th-century colonial America excluded children of at least one black parent from the status of being white. Some 19th-century categorization schemes defined people with one black parent (the other white) as mulatto, with one black grandparent as quadroon and with one black great grandparent as octoroon. The latter categories remained within an overall black or African American category. Many members of these categories passed temporarily or permanently as white. Since several thousand blacks have been crossing the color line each year, the phenomenon known as "passing for white", millions of White Americans have recent African ancestors. A statistical analysis done in 1958 estimated that 21% of the white population had African ancestors. The study concluded that the majority of Americans of African descent were actually white and not black.

Asian Americans

East Asian Americans
Beginning in the mid-19th century, the United States experienced significant immigration from East Asia and the Indian subcontinent. Later, as a reaction against Chinese and other East Asian immigrants as competitors of white labor, the Workingmen's Party was created in California. Xenophobic fears manifested with the Yellow Peril ideology, positing that Asians could outnumber the white population in some areas and become dominant.

The Naturalization Act of 1790 restricted naturalized American citizenship to whites. However, United States v. Wong Kim Ark in 1898 confirmed citizenship by birth in the U.S. regardless of race. As a result, in the early 20th century, many new arrivals with origins in the Far East petitioned the courts to be legally classified as white, resulting in the existence of many United States Supreme Court rulings on their "whiteness". In 1921, a petition for naturalization by Easurk Emsen Charr was denied as the court ruled that Koreans are not white. In 1922, the court case Ozawa v. United States deemed that Japanese are part of the Mongoloid race, and thus non-white.

In Jim Crow era Mississippi, however, Chinese American children were allowed to attend white-only schools and universities, rather than attend black-only schools, and some of their parents became members of the infamous Mississippi "White Citizens' Council" who enforced policies of racial segregation.

Despite an opposite trend in other parts of the United States, in 1927, the Supreme Court decision Lum v. Rice codified the right of states to define a Chinese student as non-white for the purpose of segregating public schools. As the Jim crow era lasted between 1876 and 1965, this effectively placed Lum v. Rice within that same time period.

In a precursor to Brown v. Board, the 1947 federal legal case Mendez v. Westminster fought to take down segregated schools for Mexican American and white students. In doing so, this prompted California Governor Earl Warren to repeal a state law calling for segregation of Native American and Asian American students in that state. Segregation of the American education system during the Jim Crow era also impacted East Asians, however the Mendez decision ended this impact on Asian Americans. As a result of Wysinger v. Crookshank (1890), black people were integrated into California's education system and thus never attended segregated public schools during the Jim Crow era in California.

South Asian Americans

South Asian Americans constitute a broad group of ethnic groups and racial classification of each of these groups has varied over the years. The classification of Indian Americans has varied over the years and across institutions. Originally, neither the U.S. courts nor the census bureau categorized Indians as a race because there were only negligible numbers of Indian immigrants in the United States. Various court judgements instead deemed Indians to be "white" or "not white" for the purposes of law.

Unlike Indian Americans, Sri Lankan Americans and Nepalese Americans have always been classified as "Asian". Before 1975, both groups were classified as "other Asian". In 1975, they were given their own separate categories within the broader Asian American category.

In 1909, Bhicaji Balsara became the first Indian to gain U.S. citizenship, as a Zoroastrian Parsi he was ruled to be "the purest of Aryan type" and "as distinct from Hindus as are the English who dwell in India". Almost thirty years later, the same circuit court to accept Balsara ruled that Rustom Dadabhoy Wadia, another Parsi also from Bombay was not white and therefore not eligible to receive U.S. citizenship.

In 1923, the Supreme Court decided in United States v. Bhagat Singh Thind that people of Indian descent were not 'white' men, and thus not eligible to citizenship. The court conceded that, while Thind was a high caste Hindu born in the northern Punjab region and classified by certain scientific authorities as of the Aryan race, he was not 'white' since the word Aryan "has to do with linguistic and not at all with physical characteristics" and since "the average man knows perfectly well that there are unmistakable and profound differences" between Indians and White Americans. Associate Justice George Sutherland wrote that Indians "cannot be properly assigned to any of the enumerated grand racial divisions". Following the Thind ruling, the U.S. government attempted to strip Indian Americans of their citizenship, but were forced to drop many of the cases after losing their case against Thind's own lawyer, Sakharam Ganesh Pandit, who successfully argued that he would be unjustly harmed by removal of his American citizenship.

The U.S. Census Bureau has over the years changed its own classification of Indians. In 1930 and 1940, Indian Americans were classified as "Hindu" by "Race", and in 1950 and 1960, they were categorized as Other Race, and in 1970, they were deemed white. Since 1980, Indians and other South Asians have been classified according to self-reporting, with many selecting "Asian Indian" to differentiate themselves from peoples of "American Indian" or Native American background.

Southeast Asian Americans

In the 1894 case of In re Po, the court ruled that Burmese are not white based on common knowledge and legal precedent. Moreover, courts ruled Filipinos as not white in the following cases: In re Mallari (1916), In re Rallos (1917), United States v. Javier (1927), De La Ysla v. United States (1935), and De Cano v. State (1941).

European Americans

Finnish Americans

The earliest Finnish immigrants to the U.S. were colonists who were Swedes in the legal sense and perhaps spoke Swedish. They settled in the Swedish colony of New Sweden. One of the Founding Fathers of the United States of America, John Morton, who signed the Declaration of Independence, was Finnish. Franklin D. Roosevelt, the 32nd President of the United States, descended from one of the 17th-century Finnish colonists in New Sweden. More recent Finns were on several occasions "racially" discriminated against and not seen as white, but "Asian". The reasons for this were the arguments and theories about the Finns originally being of Mongolian instead of native European origin due to the Finnish language belonging to the Uralic and not the Indo-European language family.

Minnesota, home to a strong mining industry at the turn of the 20th century, was the stage of several politically-motivated conflicts between laborers and anti-union leaders. In 1907, a group of between 10,000 and 16,000 immigrants – the majority of whom were Finnish – staged a large strike against Oliver Iron Mining Company. In response, the company began screening its immigrant-based workforce by their country of origin. Finns regularly comprised the most numerous and vocal groups of protestors, feeding into beliefs that the Finnish ethnic group was less capable of assimilating well into the American workforce. Oliver refused to hire more Finns.

One year after the major strike, the company's superintendent stated:

Their people [the Finns] are good laborers but trouble breeders.... They are a race that tries to take advantage of the companies at every opportunity and are not to be trusted.

Acrimony towards Finnish social radicals in Minnesota's political milieu reached a head in the case of John Svan and 15 associates. On January 4, 1908, a trial was held regarding whether John Svan, a socialist, and several other Finnish immigrants would become naturalized United States citizens or not, as the process only was for "whites" and "blacks" in general and district prosecutor John Sweet maintained that Finnish immigrants were Mongols. Sweet linked the "socialistic ideology" of Finnish radicals with other collectivist East Asian philosophies to underscore his position that Finns were of an Asiatic frame of mind that was out of harmony with American thought. The judge, William Alexander Cant, later concluded that the Finnish people may have been Mongolian from the beginning, but that the climate they lived in for a long time, and historical Finnish immigration and assimilation of Germanic tribes (Teutons)—which he considered modern "pure Finns" indistinguishable from—had made the Finnish population one of the whitest people in Europe. If the Finns had Mongol ancestry, it was distant and diluted. John Svan and the others were made naturalized U.S. citizens, and from that day on, the law forbade treating Finnish immigrants and Americans of Finnish descent as not white.

In the beginning of the 20th century, there was a lot resentment from the local American population towards the Finnish settlers because they were seen as having very different customs, and were slow in learning English. Another reason was that many of them had come from the "red" side of Finland, and thus held socialist political views.

German Americans

Large numbers of Germans migrated to North America between the 1680s and 1760s. Many settled in the Province of Pennsylvania. In the 18th century, numerous English Americans in Pennsylvania harbored resentment towards the increasing number of German settlers. Benjamin Franklin, in Observations Concerning the Increase of Mankind, Peopling of Countries, etc., complained about the increasing influx of German Americans, stating that they had a negative influence on American society. According to Franklin, the only exception to this were Germans of Saxon descent, "who with the English, make the principal Body of White People on the Face of the Earth. I could wish their Numbers were increased".

Unlike most European immigrant groups, whose acceptance as white came gradually over the course of the late 19th century (that is, in U.S. colloquial definitions, since virtually all Europeans were white by legal U.S. definition except the Finns), Germans were quickly accepted as white.

Hispanic Americans

Hispanic Americans are Americans who have a significant number of Spanish-speaking Latin American ancestors or Spanish ancestors. While Latin Americans have a broad array of ethnic, racial and cultural backgrounds, they all tend to be indiscriminately labeled 'Hispanic', giving that term a "racial" value.

It was not until the 1980s after years of protest from Chicanos that the United States government created the term Hispanic to classify all peoples who come from Spanish-speaking countries. The term Hispanic has in recent years in the United States been given racial value with the perception of a racial Hispanic look being that of Native American race or of the mixed races, usually mestizo or mulatto, as the majority of the people who immigrate from Spanish-speaking countries to the United States are of that racial origin. Due to this racial perception of Hispanics even among Hispanic Americans themselves, white Hispanics and Latinos, black Hispanics and Latinos, and Asian Hispanics and Latinos are often overlooked in the U.S. mass media and in general American social perceptions. The white Hispanics and Latinos who are perceived as "Hispanic" by Americans usually possess typical Mediterranean or Southern European pigmentation - olive skin, dark hair, and dark eyes - as most Spanish and white Latin American immigrants are and most white Hispanics and Latinos are.

On the 2000 census form, race and ethnicity are distinct questions. A respondent who checks the "Hispanic or Latino" ethnicity box must also check one or more of the five official race categories. Of the over 35 million Hispanics or Latinos in the 2000 census, a plurality of 48.6% identified as "white," 48.2% identified as "Other" (most of whom are presumed of mixed races such as mestizo or mulatto), and the remaining 3.2% identified as "black" and other races.

By 2010, the number of Hispanics identifying as white has increased by a wide margin since the year 2000 on the 2010 census form, of the over 50 million people who identified as Hispanic and Latino Americans a majority 53% identified as "white", 36.7% identified as "Other" (most of whom are presumed of mixed races such as mestizo or mulatto), 6% identified as "Two or more races", 2.5% identified as "black", 1.4% identified as "American Indian and Alaska Native", and the remaining 0.5% identified as other races.

The media and some Hispanic community leaders in the United States refer to Hispanics as a separate group from all others, as well as "whites" and the "white majority". This may be because "white" is often used as shorthand for "non-Hispanic white". Thus, the non-Hispanic population and some Hispanic community leaders refer to white Hispanics as non-Hispanic whites and white Hispanic actors/actresses in media are mostly given non-Hispanic roles while, in turn, are given the most roles in the U.S. Hispanic mass media that the white Hispanics are overrepresented and admired in the U.S. Hispanic mass media and social perceptions. Multiracial Latinos have limited media appearance; critics have accused the U.S. Hispanic media of overlooking the brown-skinned indigenous and multiracial Hispanic and black Hispanic populations by over-representation of blond and blue/green-eyed white Hispanic and Latino Americans and also light-skinned mulatto and mestizo Hispanic and Latino Americans (often deemed as white persons in U.S. Hispanic and Latino populations if achieving the middle class or higher social status), especially some of the actors on the telenovelas.

Mexican Americans

The official racial status of Mexican Americans has varied throughout American history. From 1850 to 1920, the U.S. census form did not distinguish between whites and Mexican Americans. In 1930, the U.S. census form asked for "color or race," and census enumerators were instructed to write W for white and Mex for Mexican. In 1940 and 1950, the census reverted its decision and made Mexicans be classified as white again and thus the instructions were to "Report white (W) for Mexicans unless they were definitely of full Indigenous Indian or other non-white races (such as Black or Asian)".

During periods in U.S. history when racial intermarriage was not legally acknowledged, and when Mexicans and Mexican Americans were uniformly allotted white status, they were legally allowed to intermarry with what today are termed non-Hispanic whites, unlike blacks and Asians. They were allowed to acquire U.S. citizenship upon arrival; served in all-white units during World War II; could vote and hold elected office in places such as Texas, especially San Antonio; ran the state politics and constituted most of the elite of New Mexico since colonial times; and went to segregated white schools in Central Texas and Los Angeles. Additionally, Asians were barred from marrying Mexican Americans because Mexicans were legally white.

U.S. nativists in the late 1920s and 1930s (mostly due to the socially xenophobic and economic climate of the Great Depression) tried to put a halt to Mexican immigration by having Mexicans (and Mexican Americans) declared non-white, by virtue of their Indian heritage. After 70 years of being in the United States and having been bestowed white status by the U.S. government, this was the first time the United States began to show true racist attitudes towards Mexicans in America, something that usually came quickly to people of other races. They based their strategy on a 1924 law that barred entry to immigrants who were ineligible for citizenship, and at that point, only blacks and whites, and not Asians or Native Americans, could naturalize and become U.S. citizens. The test case came in December 1935, when a Buffalo, N.Y. judge rejected Jalisco native Timoteo Andrade's application for citizenship on the grounds that he was a "Mexican Indian". Had it not been for the intervention of the Mexican and American governments, who forced a second hearing, this precedent could very well have made many Mexicans, the majority of whom are mestizo, ineligible for citizenship. When mixed-race Mexicans were allowed to retain their white status in American society they were unperturbed with the fact that the United States still continued its discriminatory practices towards Mexicans of full indigenous heritage.

During the Great Depression, Mexicans were largely considered non-white. As many as 400,000 Mexicans and Mexican Americans were deported in a decade-long effort by the government called the Mexican Repatriation.

In the 2000 U.S. census, around half of all persons of Mexican or Mexican American origin in the U.S. checked white to register their race (in addition to stating their Mexican national origin). Mexican Americans are the largest white Hispanic group in the United States.

West Indian Americans

Caribbean countries such as Cuba, the U.S. territory of Puerto Rico, and especially the Dominican Republic have a complex ethnic heritage since they include indigenous and African legacies. Africans were forcibly transported to the islands throughout the colonial period (and indeed blacks accompanied the first Spanish explorers, with more arriving to harvest sugar in the 18th century prior to the Revolution).

Cuban Americans and Puerto Ricans exemplify this complex ethnic status. The Cuban exiles and the Puerto Rican who migrated, entered the United States before 1959 tended to be of European ancestry (most particularly Spanish ancestry) and therefore were/are white. Their appearance let them be more accepted by an American culture that openly attacked Afro-Cubans and Afro-Puerto Ricans, and other races. In some cases, this white racial status "allowed them to feel superior over other racial and ethnic groups and to make claims to rights and privileges".

Irish Americans

Beginning in the 1840s, negative assessments of the "Irish character" became more and more racialized. Irish people were considered brutish and (like blacks) were often compared to simians. The "Celtic physiognomy" was described as being marked by an "upturned nose [and] the black tint of the skin."

Labor historian Eric Arnesen wrote in 2001 that "the notion that the non-white Irish became white has become axiomatic" among many academics. Whiteness scholar David Roediger has argued that during the early period of Irish immigration to the United States "it was by no means clear that the Irish were white" or "that they would be admitted to all the rights of whites and granted all the privileges of citizenship". However, Arnesen suggests that the Irish were in fact granted full rights and privileges upon naturalization and that early Irish immigrants "often blended unproblematically into American society". Law professor David Bernstein has questioned the idea that Irish-Americans were once non-white, writing that Irish Americans were "indeed considered white by law and by custom" despite the fact that they experienced "discrimination, hostility, assertions of inferiority and occasionally even violence". Bernstein notes that Irish Americans were not targeted by laws against interracial marriage, were allowed to attend whites-only schools, were classified as white in the Jim Crow South, and were never subjected to anti-Irish immigration restrictions. The sociologists Philip Q. Yang and Kavitha Koshy have also questioned what they call the "becoming white thesis", noting that Irish Americans have been legally classified as white since the first U.S. census in 1790, that Irish Americans were legally white for the purposes of the Naturalization Act of 1790 that limited citizenship to "free White person(s)", and that they could find no legislative or judicial evidence that Irish Americans had ever been considered non-white.

Italian Americans

In certain parts of the South during the Jim Crow era, Italians "occupied a racial middle ground within the otherwise unforgiving, binary caste system of white-over-black." Though Italians were viewed as white for purposes of naturalization and voting, their social standing was that they represented a "problem at best." Their racial status was impacted by their appearance and that they did not "act" white, engaging in manual labor ordinarily reserved for blacks. Italians continued to occupy a "middle ground in the racial order" through the 1920s.

However, "color challenges were never sustained or systematic" when it came to Italians, who were "largely accepted as white by the widest variety of people and institutions" throughout the U.S. Even in the South, such as Louisiana, any attempts to disenfranchise them "failed miserably".

During the majority of American history, Italians were often not considered white. Around 1900, as Italians were disembarking at Ellis Island and New Orleans by the millions, they were required to check off "Southern Italian" or "Sicilian" rather than "White" on entry forms. Emigration from Italy to the United States began before Italian unification and reached its peak at a time when regional differences were still very strong and marked, both linguistically and ethnically. Therefore, many Italian immigrants identified (and still identify) primarily on a regional rather than a national basis. This difference has largely contributed to Italians identifying or being labeled as non-white in America.

After large numbers of Italians entered into the United States, legal restrictions were put in place to stop further immigration. The Emergency Quota Act, and the subsequent Immigration Act of 1924 sharply reduced immigration from Italy except for relatives already in the United States. In certain parts of the South during the Jim Crow era, Italians were affected by discriminatory policies. The reason Italians were prone to racial discrimination was due to the fact that they were seen as much darker. This led to one of the most notable hate crimes against Italian Americans, which was the trial of nineteen Italian immigrants for the murder of New Orleans police chief David Hennessy in 1890. The trial ended in the lynching of eleven of them by a white vigilante group.

Middle Eastern Americans

The Census Bureau includes the "original peoples of Europe, North Africa, or the Middle East" among white people. Under pressure from advocacy groups, the Census Bureau announced in 2014 that it would consider establishing a new, MENA ethnic category for populations from the Middle East, North Africa, and the Arab world, separate from the "white" category. If approved by the Census Bureau, the category would also require approval by Congress.

The courts ruled Middle Easterners as not white in the following cases: In re Halladjian (1909), Ex parte Shahid (1913), Ex Parte Dow (1914), In re Dow (1914), and In re Ahmed Hassan (1942). The courts ruled Arabs, Syrians, Middle Easterners, or Armenians to be white in the following cases: In re Najour (1909), In re Mudarri (1910), In re Ellis (1910), Dow v. United States (1915), United States v. Cartozian (1925), and Ex Parte Mohriez (1944).

Arab Americans

From 1909 to 1944, members of Arab American communities in the United States sought naturalized citizenship through an official recognition as white. During this period, the courts were inconsistent in defining Arabs as white granting some eligibility for citizenship, while denying others. Therefore, in the first half of the 20th century, many Arabs were naturalized as "white American" citizens, while others were deported as "non-white aliens".

One of the earliest cases includes the case of police officer George Shishim. Born in Zahlé, Lebanon, Shishim immigrated to the United States in 1894 becoming a police officer in Venice, Los Angeles. According to Gualtieri (2009), Shishim's "legal battle to prove his whiteness began after he arrested the son of a prominent lawyer for disturbing the peace." The man arrested argued that because Shishim was not white, and thus ineligible for citizenship, that his arrest was invalid. Shishim's attorney's, with support from the Syrian-Lebanese and Arab communities, argued Arabs shared Caucasian ancestry and are thus white. Judge Frank Hutton, who presided over the case, cited legal precedent ruling that the term "white person" included Syrians. Despite this ruling, neither U.S. immigration authorities nor courts across the country consistently defined Arabs as whites, and many Arabs continued to be deported through the 1940s.

Among the most important cases was Dow v. United States (1915) in which Syrian George Dow was determined to be of the "Caucasian" race and thus eligible for citizenship. In 1914, Judge Smith denied George Dow citizenship twice ruling that Syrians were not white and thus ineligible for citizenship. Dow appealed these decisions and in Dow v. United States, the United States Court of Appeals overturned the lower court's decisions, defined Syrians as white, and affirmed Dow's right to naturalization. However, this decision did not apply to North Africans or non-Levantine Arabs, and some courts claimed that only Syrians (and not other Arab persons) were white. The situation was resolved in 1943, when all Arabs and North Africans were deemed white by the federal government. Ex Parte Mohriez (1944) and the 1977 OMB Directive 15 include Middle Eastern and North African in the definition of white.

Armenian Americans

Another 1909 immigration and naturalization case found that Armenians were white and thus eligible for citizenship. A U.S. circuit court judge in Boston, ruling on a citizenship application by four Armenians, overruled government objections and found that West Asians were so mixed with Europeans that it was impossible to tell whether they were white or should be excluded as part of the "yellow race". In making the ruling, the judge also noted that the government had already made no objection to Jews. The judge ruled that "if aboriginal people of Asia are excluded it is hard to find a loophole for the admission of Hebrews."

Jewish Americans

In the 19th and early 20th centuries, Jews of European descent were legally classified as white, but were frequently described as "Mongoloid" and "Asiatic" by advocates of scientific racism. During the 19th century, the United States Bureau of Immigration had classified European Jews as "Slavonic...a subgroup of the elite Aryan stock", but the Dillingham Commission contended that linguistic, physical, and other criteria classified Jews as Semites, thus "lower down on the Caucasian ladder". A 1909 Census Bureau ruling related to the case of George Shishim to classify Syrians as "Mongolians", thus non-white and ineligible for citizenship, caused American Jewish leaders to fear that Jews would soon be denaturalized as well.

The racial status of Jews has continued to engender debate, with some commentators arguing that ethnic Jews are collectively non-white.

Native Americans

In Oklahoma, state laws identified Native Americans as legally white during the Jim Crow era.

In the late 19th and 20th centuries, many saw Native Americans as people without a future, who should be assimilated into a larger American culture. Tribal membership was frequently defined according to so-called blood quantum standards (proven through a Certificate of Degree of Indian Blood), so that people of mostly white ancestry and more distant Native ancestry were denied any formal ties with their ancestral tribe. This led to the classification of increasing numbers of people of distant indigenous ancestry as white. This trend has been reversed in census figures of recent decades, which show increasing self-identification among mixed-race people as ethnically or culturally Native American. The 2000 census includes "tribal affiliation or community attachment" as part of the definitions of American Indian and Alaska Native.

Pacific Islander Americans

In the 1889 case of In re Kanaka Nian, the court ruled that Hawaiians are not white based on scientific evidence.

See also

Historical racial and ethnic demographics of the United States
Race and ethnicity in the United States
Race and ethnicity in the United States census
The History of White People
Miscegenation
Passing
People of color
Racism in the United States

References

Further reading
 Ignatiev, Noel (1996). How the Irish Became White. New York: Routledge. 
 
 

Ethnic groups in the United States
Race and law in the United States
Whiteness in the United States
White Americans